Qarah Vali (also Romanized as Qarah Valī and Qarahvalī; also known as Yāstī Bolāghī) is a village in Fuladlui Jonubi Rural District, Hir District, Ardabil County, Ardabil Province, Iran. At the 2006 census, its population was 41, in 8 families.

References 

Towns and villages in Ardabil County